Shelby County is a county located in the U.S. state of Illinois. According to the 2020 census, it had a population of 20,990. Its county seat is Shelbyville.

History
Shelby County was established in 1827 out of Fayette County. It was named in honor of Isaac Shelby, governor of Kentucky and participant in the American Revolutionary War.

Geography

Climate and weather

Major highways
  Interstate 57
  U.S. Highway 45
  U.S. Highway 51
  Illinois Route 16
  Illinois Route 32
  Illinois Route 128

Adjacent counties

 Macon County - north
 Moultrie County - northeast
 Coles County - east
 Cumberland County - east
 Effingham County - south
 Fayette County - south
 Montgomery County - southwest
 Christian County - west

Demographics

As of the 2010 United States Census, there were 22,363  people, 9,216 households, and 6,376 families living in the county. The racial makeup of the county was 98.6% white, 0.3% Asian, 0.2% American Indian, 0.2% black or African American, 0.2% from other races, and 0.6% from two or more races. Those of Hispanic or Latino origin made up 0.8% of the population. In terms of ancestry, 25.5% were German, 9.9% were English, 9.8% were American, and 8.8% were Irish.

Of the 9,216  households, 29.2% had children under the age of 18 living with them, 57.1% were married couples living together, 8.0% had a female householder with no husband present, 30.8% were non-families, and 27.1% of all households were made up of individuals. The average household size was 2.40 and the average family size was 2.90. The median age was 43.5 years.

The median income for a household in the county was $44,627 and the median income for a family was $55,655. Males had a median income of $40,119 versus $27,860 for females. The per capita income for the county was $21,891. About 7.8% of families and 11.3% of the population were below the poverty line, including 16.7% of those under age 18 and 8.1% of those age 65 or over.

Communities

Cities
 Shelbyville (seat)
 Windsor
 Moweaqua

Town
 Sigel

Villages

 Cowden
 Findlay
 Herrick
 Oconee
 Stewardson
 Strasburg
 Tower Hill

Census-designated place
 Westervelt

Other unincorporated communities

 Clarksburg
 Lakewood
 Mode

Townships
Shelby County is divided into these townships:

 Ash Grove
 Big Spring
 Clarksburg
 Cold Spring
 Dry Point
 Flat Branch
 Herrick
 Holland
 Lakewood
 Moweaqua
 Oconee
 Okaw
 Penn
 Pickaway
 Prairie
 Richland
 Ridge
 Rose
 Rural
 Shelbyville
 Sigel
 Todds Point
 Tower Hill
 Windsor

Politics

See also
 National Register of Historic Places listings in Shelby County

References

 
Illinois counties
1827 establishments in Illinois
Populated places established in 1827